

Dilip Hiro, born in Larkana, Pakistan is an Indian author, journalist and commentator who specializes in the politics of South Asia and Middle East.

Career
Hiro originally trained as an engineer in India before moving to the UK to further his career and "explore the West".
 
Hiro was the chief analyst on the Middle Eastern, Central Asian, South Asian and Islamic affairs, and terrorism for the Rome-based Inter Press Service International Features Agency (1992–99), and the London-based Gemini News Service features agency (1999–2002).

He is also a frequent contributor to the following online magazines: The Guardian’s Commentisfree; Yale University’s Yale Globalist; and the New York-based Nation Institute’s website TomDispatch.

Books 
Non-Fiction
Cold War in the Islamic World: Saudi Arabia, Iran and the Struggle for Supremacy (2018) 
The Age of Aspiration: Power, Wealth, and Conflict in Globalizing India (2016) 
The Longest August: The Unflinching Rivalry Between India and Pakistan (2015) 
Indians in a Globalizing World: Their Skewed Rise (2014) 
A Comprehensive Dictionary of the Middle East (2013)
Apocalyptic Realm: Jihadists in South Asia (2012)
After Empire: The Birth of a Multipolar World (2010) (shortlisted for the Mirabaud Prize of the Forum International Médias Nord-Sud)
Inside Central Asia: A Political and Cultural History of Uzbekistan, Turkmenistan, Kazakhstan, Kyrgyzstan, Tajikistan, Turkey and Iran (2009) (on The Financial Times’s List of Best History Books of the Year)
Blood of the Earth: The Battle for the World’s Vanishing Oil Resources (2007)
The Timeline History of India (2006)
The Iranian Labyrinth: Journeys through Theocratic Iran and Its Furies (2005)
Secrets and Lies: Operation 'Iraqi Freedom' and After (2004)/ (Financial Times’ Best Politics and Religion Book of the Year) / (Long-listed for the George Orwell Prize for Political Writing)
The Essential Middle East: A Comprehensive Guide (2003)
Iraq: In The Eye Of The Storm (2002)
War Without End: The Rise of Islamist Terrorism and Global Response (2002), 
The Rough Guide History of India (2002)
Neighbors, Not Friends: Iraq and Iran after the Gulf Wars (2001)
Sharing the Promised Land: A Tale of Israelis and Palestinians (1998)
Dictionary of the Middle East (1996)
The Middle East (1996)
Between Marx and Muhammad: The Changing Face of Central Asia (1995)
Lebanon, Fire and Embers: A History of the Lebanese Civil War (1993)
Desert Shield to Desert Storm: The Second Gulf War (1992)
Black British, White British: A History of Race Relations in Britain (1991)
The Longest War: The Iran-Iraq Military Conflict (1991)
Holy Wars: The Rise of Islamic Fundamentalism (1989)
Iran: The Revolution Within (1988)
Iran under the Ayatollahs (1985)
Inside the Middle East (1982)
Inside India Today (1977)
The Untouchables of India (1975)
Black British, White British (1973)
The Indian Family in Britain (1969)

Fiction
Three Plays (1985)
Interior, Exchange, Exterior (Poems, 1980)
Apply, Apply, No Reply & A Clean Break (Two Plays, 1978)
To Anchor a Cloud (Play, 1972)
A Triangular View (Novel, 1969)

Editor
Babur Nama: Journal of Emperor Babur (2006)

Contributor

 A World Connected: Globalization In The 21st Century (ed.) Nayan Chanda (2013)
 Encyclopedia Of Global Studies (eds.) Helmut Anheier & Mark Juergensmeyer (2012)
 The World According To Tomdispatch: America In The New Age Of Empire (ed.) Tom Englehardt (2008)
 New Makers Of Modern Culture, Vol. 2, (ed.) Justin Wintle (2007)
 New Makers Of Modern Culture, Vol. 1 (ed.) Justin Wintle (2007)
 The Iraq War Reader (eds) Micah Sifri & Christopher Serf (2003)
 A Concise History Of India (a new chapter), (2002)
 A Just Response: The Nation On Terrorism, Democracy And 11 September 2001 (ed.) Katrina vanden Heuvel (2002)
 What's it like? Life And Culture In Britain Today (eds) Joanne Collie & Alex Martin (2000)
 Iran And The Arab World (ed.) Hooshang Amirahmadi (1993)
 The Gulf War Reader (eds) Micah Sifri & Christopher Serf (1991)
 Makers Of Nineteenth Century Culture (ed.) Justin Wintle (1984)
 Pieces Of Hate (ed.) Brian Redhead & Kenneth McLeish (1982)
 Makers Of Modern Culture (ed.) Justin Wintle (1982)
 World Minorities, Vol II (ed.) Georgina Ashworth (1977)
 World Minorities, Vol I (ed.) Georgina Ashworth (1977)
 Colour, Culture And Consciousness (ed.) Bhikhu Parekh (1974)
 One For Sorrow, Two For Joy (ed.) Paul Barker (1972)

References

External links
 Nations without a cause The Economist's review of Hiro's "Inside Central Asia", 24 September 2009
 Blood of the Earth: Dilip Hiro on the Battle for the World’s Vanishing Oil Resources Video, Democracy Now! 31 January 2007
 Articles at Tomdispatch.com
 Articles at The Nation

People from Larkana District
Indian emigrants to England
Indian dramatists and playwrights
Indian male writers
Living people
Year of birth missing (living people)
Virginia Tech alumni
Sindhi people